FC Krasnodar-2 is a Russian football team from Krasnodar, founded in 2013. From 2013 to 2018, it played in the third-tier Russian Professional Football League. It made its debut in the second-tier Russian Football National League in the 2018–19 season. It is a farm club for the Russian Premier League team FC Krasnodar.

History
In February 2013 the owner of the FC Krasnodar, Sergey Galitsky announced its intention to create a farm club in the summer, and declare it in the Russian Professional Football League. On May 27, 2013 Galitsky confirmed that Krasnodar-2 was officially declared in the second league south zone. On July 12, 2013 Krasnodar-2 played his first official match, losing home to Chernomorets Novorossiysk by 3 to 1.

Before the 2018–19 season, FC Amkar Perm had their Russian Premier League license recalled due to debts. As a consequence, FC Anzhi Makhachkala was returned to the Premier League to take Amkar's spot, after the 2018–19 second-tier Russian Football National League calendar was already set. FC Krasnodar-2 received an emergency invitation for a promotion into the FNL and was officially admitted into the league on 26 June 2018 to take Anzhi's spot.

League position

Current squad
As of 22 February 2023, according to the First League website.

Coaching staff

Notable players

 Nikolay Komlichenko
 Khasan Akhriyev

References

External links
  Official website

Association football clubs established in 2013
Krasnodar-2
FC Krasnodar
2013 establishments in Russia